Kamila Szczecina (born 21 October 1987) is a Polish handball player for Pogoń Szczecin and the Polish national team.

She participated at the 2016 European Women's Handball Championship.

References

1987 births
Living people
Polish female handball players
Sportspeople from Nowy Sącz
21st-century Polish women